Runner's knee may refer to a number of overuse injuries involving pain around the kneecap (patella), such as:
Patellofemoral pain syndrome
Chondromalacia patellae
Iliotibial band syndrome
Plica syndrome

Knee injuries and disorders